Jamie Hart may refer to:

Jamie Hart (cricketer) (born 1975), English cricketer
Jamie Hart (Family Affairs), fictional character in the former British soap opera Family Affairs

See also
James Hart (disambiguation)